Griever could refer to 

A mourner
Squall Leonhart, the lead character in Final Fantasy VIII
Griever de Hocus, the lead character in Gerald Vizenor's novel Griever: An American Monkey King in China
Griever, a creature in The Maze Runner by James Dashner